Chembarakky is town on Aluva-Munnar Highway (SH-16) between Perumbavoor and Aluva. Chembarakky junction is where bus route to Ernakulam from Perumbavoor diverges from Perumbavoor-Aluva route.

Organizations
 Muthoot Fincorp Limited
 Thadiyittaparambu Police Station
 Jamia Hassania Public School
 Thazkiya International School

Religious places
 St: George Jacobite Church, Chembarakky
 Chembarakky Juma Masjid

Location

References 

Cities and towns in Ernakulam district